Carlos Augusto Pimenta de Campos (sometimes listed as Guto, born July 5, 1978) is a Brazilian sprint canoeist who competed in the early 2000s. At the 2000 Summer Olympics in Sydney, he was eliminated in the semifinals of both the K-2 500 m and the K-2 1000 m events.

References
Sports-Reference.com profile

1978 births
Brazilian male canoeists
Canoeists at the 2000 Summer Olympics
Canoeists at the 2007 Pan American Games
Living people
Olympic canoeists of Brazil
Pan American Games medalists in canoeing
Pan American Games gold medalists for Brazil
Pan American Games silver medalists for Brazil
Pan American Games bronze medalists for Brazil
Medalists at the 2007 Pan American Games
20th-century Brazilian people
21st-century Brazilian people